Garth Graham April (born ) is a South African rugby union player who most recently played for the NTT Communications Shining Arcs in the Top League in Japan. His regular position is fullback, but he can also play as a fly-half or centre.

Career

Boland

April grew up in the Western Cape and earned his first provincial call-up in 2007, when he represented Boland in the Under-16 Grant Khomo Week competition. In 2008, he was selected to play for them in the premier high school rugby union competition in South Africa, the Under-18 Craven Week held in Pretoria. He was also selected in an Under-18 Elite squad and eventually the South African Schools side in the same year.

Golden Lions

April moved to Gauteng in 2009 where he finished his schooling at Hoërskool Florida in Roodepoort. He once again played at the Craven Week tournament, this time representing the Golden Lions in the 2009 edition held in Welkom and was included in a South African Under-18 High Performance squad later in the same year. He was also included in the  squad for the 2009 Under-19 Provincial Championship.

After finishing school, April joined the Golden Lions on a three-year contract and once again played for the s in the Under-19 Provincial Championship in 2010. He moved up an age group and represented the s in the 2011 Under-21 Provincial Championship, although his game-time was limited, just making two appearances from the bench.

In 2012, April was included in the ' squad for the 2012 Vodacom Cup. His third appearance for the Golden Lions was in their match against  in Kimberley; he played off the bench in the first half and scored the decisive try (his first in senior rugby) thirteen minutes from the end to help his side to a 35–30 victory to hand Griquas their only victory over the regular season. He scored a late try in the quarter final against , but it ended up being a mere consolation try, with Western Province advancing to the semi-finals by winning the match 58–34. In the latter half of the year, April represented the s in the 2012 Under-21 Provincial Championship, establishing himself as their first-choice fullback, starting in that position on eight occasions. He scored five tries and fourteen points with the boot to end the campaign as the Golden Lions' second-highest point scorer behind regular kicker Marais Schmidt.

Boland Cavaliers

He made four appearances for them during the 2013 Vodacom Cup competition, scoring four points, and twice during the 2014 Vodacom Cup competition. However, a serious knee injury curtailed his progress at Boland and he was released at the end of 2014.

Durbanville-Bellville / Western Province

April joined Western Province amateur club side Durbanville-Bellville, who finished fourth in the Western Province Super League A and won through a series of play-offs to qualify for the 2015 SARU Community Cup. He played in all seven of their matches during the competition and helped his side all the way to the final, despite being the last team to qualify. His contributions proved decisive in the final against hosts and defending champions Rustenburg Impala, scoring Durbanville-Bellville's opening try of the match and kicking two conversions and two penalties for a personal haul of 15 points in their 31–30 victory, to secure the title for his side for the first time. After the competition, April was also named as the Young Player of the Tournament.

This also earned him another provincial call-up, with  including him in their squad for the 2015 Vodacom Cup.

Sharks

International rugby

On 28 May 2016, April was included in a 31-man  squad for their three-test match series against a touring  team. After training with the national team for a few days, he joined the South Africa 'A' squad for their two-match series against a touring England Saxons team. He was named in the starting line-up for their first match in Bloemfontein and opened the scoring for his team by converting a penalty in the tenth minute of the match, but ended on the losing side as the visitors ran out 32–24 winners.

Personal

April is the younger brother of rugby player Brendon April.

References

South African rugby union players
Living people
1991 births
Rugby union players from Cape Town
Rugby union fly-halves
Rugby union centres
Rugby union fullbacks
Boland Cavaliers players
Golden Lions players
Sharks (Currie Cup) players
Western Province (rugby union) players
Shimizu Koto Blue Sharks players
Sunwolves players
Sharks (rugby union) players
Urayasu D-Rocks players